Most is a small settlement in the Municipality of Mokronog-Trebelno in southeastern Slovenia. It lies on the right bank of the Mirna River, just south of the village of Hrastovica. The area is part of the historical region of Lower Carniola. The municipality is now included in the Southeast Slovenia Statistical Region.

References

External links
Most on Geopedia

Populated places in the Municipality of Mokronog-Trebelno